Cathedral Hill is a neighborhood in the city of Lusaka, the capital of Zambia.

Location
The neighborhood is bordered by Independence Avenue to the south and Cairo Road (T2) to the west. Church Road, Addis Ababa Road and Los Angeles Boulevard form the northern boundary of the neighborhood. The eastern boundary in marked by Leopards Hill Road and Chindo Road. The coordinates of the neighborhood are 15°25'17.0"S, 28°18'35.0"E (Latitude:-15.421391; Longitude:28.309716).

Overview
The neighborhood houses important national buildings, hotels, embassies, houses of worship, and businesses, including the following:

 Supreme Court of Zambia
 High Court of Zambia
 Lusaka Central Railway Station
 Lusaka Central Bus Terminal
 Lusaka National Museum
 Headquarters of Zambia Development Agency
 High commission of Malawi to Zambia
 Cathedral of the Holy Cross (Anglican), seat of the Diocese of Lusaka
 Headquarters of the Examinations Council of Zambia
 Zambian Italian Orthopedic Hospital

See also
 Chelston
 Garden Township
 Matero
 Ridgeway

References

External links 
Website of Lusaka City Council
Lusaka: A Brief Cultural and Political History

Neighborhoods of Lusaka